Zatonie  is a village in the administrative district of Gmina Zielona Góra, within Zielona Góra County, Lubusz Voivodeship, in western Poland.

Formerly a part of the Duchy of Sagan, the village has existed since the 13th century. It became a significant political and cultural centre of the region in the middle of the 19th century when the palace in Günthersdorf was inherited by Princess Dorothea of Courland.
After 1945, the region became Polish and was given its current name.

References

Zatonie

Palaces in Poland